Marco Macina (born 30 September 1964) is a Sammarinese former footballer.

One of only two Sanmarinese players to appear in the Italian Serie A (the other being Massimo Bonini), playing alongside Roberto Mancini with Bologna, Macina was not able to fully show his potential, despite having been signed by AC Milan in 1985. He left professional football in 1988, after a Serie C season with Ancona. Macina also played two European Cup qualifying matches for San Marino in 1990.

Career

Club 
A young promising attacking midfielder of international football, having taken the first steps with Tre Penne, he has worn the jerseys of Bologna, Arezzo, Parma, Milan, Reggiana, and Ancona, but had to leave professional football at age 25 from complications due to the rupture of a ligament in his right knee.

During his career, he had a total of 13 appearances in Serie A and 51 appearances in Serie B. He scored 6 goals in Serie B.

National 
He played for the Italian's Under-16 National Team (before 1988, the year of the San Marino National Team affiliation to FIFA and UEFA, the Sammarinese footballers were in fact assimilated Italians), winning the European Football Championship U-16 in 1982.

Achievements

Club

Campionato Italiano Serie C1: 1 
Ancona: 1987-1988 (group A)

National

European Football Championship Under-16: 1 
Italy: 1982

References

Living people
1964 births
Sammarinese footballers
San Marino international footballers
Serie A players
Serie B players
Bologna F.C. 1909 players
A.C. Milan players
Parma Calcio 1913 players
A.C. Ancona players
S.S. Arezzo players
A.C. Reggiana 1919 players
Italy youth international footballers
Association football midfielders